Kiowa County (standard abbreviation: KW) is a county located in the U.S. state of Kansas. As of the 2020 census, the county population was 2,460. The largest city and county seat is Greensburg.

History

19th century
In 1854, the Kansas Territory was organized, then in 1861 Kansas became the 34th U.S. state.  In 1867, Kiowa County was established and named after the Kiowa tribe.

21st century
On the evening of May 4, 2007, Greensburg was devastated by an EF5 tornado during the May 2007 tornado outbreak. It killed 11 and destroyed 95% of the community.

The Kiowa County Courthouse was renovated with new windows and roof after the 2007 tornado damaged it.  Originally, construction of the building started in 1920.

Geography

Kiowa County has a large number of iron-rich meteorites in its soil due to the Brenham meteor fall over 10 thousand years ago.

Adjacent counties
 Edwards County (north)
 Pratt County (east)
 Barber County (southeast)
 Comanche County (south)
 Clark County (southwest)
 Ford County (west)

Major highways
 US 54
US 183
US 400

Kiowa County has only U.S. highways, no state highways.

Demographics

As of the census of 2000, there were 3,278 people, 1,365 households, and 924 families residing in the county.  The population density was 4 people per square mile (2/km2).  There were 1,643 housing units at an average density of 2 per square mile (1/km2).  The racial makeup of the county was 97.19% White, 0.21% Black or African American, 0.61% Native American, 0.27% Asian, 0.98% from other races, and 0.73% from two or more races.  2.04% of the population were Hispanic or Latino of any race.

There were 1,365 households, out of which 27.70% had children under the age of 18 living with them, 59.60% were married couples living together, 5.30% had a female householder with no husband present, and 32.30% were non-families. 30.50% of all households were made up of individuals, and 15.50% had someone living alone who was 65 years of age or older.  The average household size was 2.32 and the average family size was 2.89.

In the county, the population was spread out, with 24.00% under the age of 18, 8.20% from 18 to 24, 21.80% from 25 to 44, 24.60% from 45 to 64, and 21.30% who were 65 years of age or older.  The median age was 42 years. For every 100 females there were 96.30 males.  For every 100 females age 18 and over, there were 95.10 males.

The median income for a household in the county was $31,576, and the median income for a family was $40,950. Males had a median income of $29,063 versus $20,764 for females. The per capita income for the county was $17,207.  About 7.40% of families and 10.80% of the population were below the poverty line, including 13.50% of those under age 18 and 8.70% of those age 65 or over.

Government

Presidential elections

Like all of the High Plains, Kiowa County is overwhelmingly Republican. The only Democrat to ever win a majority in the county has been Franklin D. Roosevelt in 1936, who ironically achieved the feat against incumbent Kansas governor Alf Landon. Woodrow Wilson won a plurality in 1916, but since 1944 only three Democrats have reached thirty percent of the county's vote, and Michael Dukakis in 1988 during a major drought and consequent farm crisis is the last Democrat to receive so much as twenty percent.

Education

Colleges
 Barclay College, Haviland

Unified school districts
 Kiowa County USD 422
 Haviland USD 474

Communities

Incorporated cities
 Greensburg
 Haviland
 Mullinville

Unincorporated communities
 Belvidere
 Brenham
 Joy
 Wellsford

Townships
Kiowa County has only one township, and none of the cities within the county are considered governmentally independent; all figures for the township include those of the cities.

See also

References

Notes

Further reading

 Standard Atlas of Kiowa County, Kansas; Geo. A. Ogle & Co; 53 pages; 1906.

External links

County
 
 Kiowa County - Directory of Public Officials
Historical
 Kiowa County from American History and Genealogy Project (AHGP)
Maps
 Kiowa County Maps: Current, Historic, KDOT
 Kansas Highway Maps: Current, Historic, KDOT
 Kansas Railroad Maps: Current, 1996, 1915, KDOT and Kansas Historical Society

 
Kansas counties
Kansas placenames of Native American origin
1867 establishments in Kansas
Populated places established in 1867